Barisciano, is a comune and town in the province of L'Aquila in the Abruzzo region of southern Italy. It is located in the Gran Sasso e Monti della Laga National Park.

Main sights
 Castle
Monastery of San Colombo. Today it houses a floriculture research center.

Notable people
 

Giovanni Bartolomucci (1923–1996), painter

References